November 30 - Eastern Orthodox liturgical calendar - December 2

All fixed commemorations below celebrated on December 14 by Eastern Orthodox Churches on the Old Calendar.

For December 1st, Orthodox Churches on the Old Calendar commemorate the Saints listed on November 18.

Saints
 Prophet Nahum (7th century BC)
 St. Onesimus, Archbishop of Ephesus (c. 107–17)
 Saints Ananias and Solochonus, Archbishops of Ephesus.  (see also: December 2)
 Hieromartyr Ananias of Persia (345)
 Saint Porphyrios, Patriarch of Antioch (404-413)
 Righteous Philaret the Merciful, of Amnia in Asia Minor (792)
 Saint Anthony the New, monk of Kios in Bithynia (865)
 Saint Theokletos, Archbishop of Sparta and Lacedaemonia (870)

Pre-Schism Western saints
 Saint Castritian, predecessor of St Calimerius as Bishop of Milan, was bishop for forty-two years (137)
 Hieromartyrs Diodorus and Marianus, and Companions, martyrs in Rome under Numerian (c. 283)
 Martyr Olympiades (Olympias), a noble from Rome (ex-consul) martyred in Amelia in Italy under Diocletian (c. 303)
 Saint Ansanus, called The Baptizer or The Apostle of Siena (304)
 Martyrs Lucius, Rogatus, Cassian and Candida, in Rome.
 Saint Ursicinus of Brescia, Bishop of Brescia in Italy, he took part in the Council of Sardica (347)
 Hieromartyr Evasius, first Bishop of Asti in Piedmont in Italy, martyred under Julian the Apostate (c. 362)
 Saint Leontius of Fréjus, Bishop of Fréjus in France from c. 419 to c. 432, a great friend of St John Cassian who dedicated his first ten Conferences to him (c. 432)
 Saint Candres of Maastricht, bishop who enlightened the Maastricht area (5th century)
 Hieromartyr Proculus of Narni or Terni, martyred by Totila, King of the Goths (c. 542)
 Saint Constantian, born in Auvergne, he became a monk at Micy (Orleans), and founded a monastery at Javron (c. 570)
 Saint Agericus (Aguy, Airy), Bishop, successor of St Desiderius in Verdun in France (591)
 Saint Eligius (Eloi, Eloy), Bishop of Noyon (Neth.) (660)
 Saint Grwst the Confessor, in the Welsh Kingdom of Gwynedd (7th century)

Other commemorations
 Translation of the relics of Saint Botolph (Botwulf of Thorney), Abbot and Confessor, of Ikanhoe, England (680)
 Repose of Righteous Virgin Barbara (Shulaeva) of Pilna (1980)

Icon gallery

Notes

References

Sources 
 December 1/14. Orthodox Calendar (PRAVOSLAVIE.RU).
 December 14 / December 1. HOLY TRINITY RUSSIAN ORTHODOX CHURCH (A parish of the Patriarchate of Moscow).
 December 1. OCA - The Lives of the Saints.
 December 1. Latin Saints of the Orthodox Patriarchate of Rome.
 The Roman Martyrology. Transl. by the Archbishop of Baltimore. Last Edition, According to the Copy Printed at Rome in 1914. Revised Edition, with the Imprimatur of His Eminence Cardinal Gibbons. Baltimore: John Murphy Company, 1916. pp. 370–371.
 Rev. Richard Stanton. A Menology of England and Wales, or, Brief Memorials of the Ancient British and English Saints Arranged According to the Calendar, Together with the Martyrs of the 16th and 17th Centuries. London: Burns & Oates, 1892. pp. 575–579.
Greek Sources
 Great Synaxaristes: 1 ΔΕΚΕΜΒΡΙΟΥ. ΜΕΓΑΣ ΣΥΝΑΞΑΡΙΣΤΗΣ.
  Συναξαριστής. 1 Δεκεμβρίου. ECCLESIA.GR. (H ΕΚΚΛΗΣΙΑ ΤΗΣ ΕΛΛΑΔΟΣ). 
Russian Sources
  14 декабря (1 декабря). Православная Энциклопедия под редакцией Патриарха Московского и всея Руси Кирилла (электронная версия). (Orthodox Encyclopedia - Pravenc.ru).
  1 декабря (ст.ст.) 14 декабря 2013 (нов. ст.). Русская Православная Церковь Отдел внешних церковных связей. (DECR).

December in the Eastern Orthodox calendar